Märten Ross (born 26 July 1971 in Tallinn) is an Estonian economist and state official.

In 1993 he graduated from Tallinn University of Technology, and later he graduated from Stockholm University (master's degree).

From 1992 to 2011 he worked at Bank of Estonia. From 2000 to 2011 he was vice-president of Bank of Estonia.

He has been a member of the student organization Korporatsioon Vironia.

In 2008 he was awarded with Order of the White Star, III class.

References

Living people
1971 births
21st-century Estonian economists
Estonian civil servants
Tallinn University of Technology alumni
Stockholm University alumni
Academic staff of the Tallinn University of Technology
Recipients of the Order of the White Star, 3rd Class